Maddison Studdon (born 16 October 1994) is an Australian rugby league footballer who plays for the Cronulla-Sutherland Sharks in the NSWRL Women's Premiership.

Background
Studdon began playing rugby league as a four-year old for Mascot Jets. She continued to play until she was too old and then switched to touch rugby.

Playing career 
In 2010, she returned to rugby league, making her senior debut for the Helensburgh Tiger Lillies, playing for the club until 2014. In 2016, she began playing for Cronulla-Caringbah Sharks.

In 2017, she was a member of the Jillaroos 2017 Women's Rugby League World Cup winning side.

In 2018, she captained New South Wales in the inaugural Women's State of Origin, which New South Wales won 16–10.

In June 2018, Studdon was announced as one of the fifteen marquee signings by the Sydney Roosters women's team. Later that year, she played for the Wests Tigers women's team in the inaugural NRL Touch Premiership, which they won.

In Round 1 of the 2018 NRL Women's Premiership, Studdon made her debut for the Sydney Roosters, starting at halfback in their 10–4 loss to the New Zealand Warriors.

On 14 June 2019, she signed with the St George Illawarra Dragons for the 2019 NRL Women's season.

References

External links
St George Illawarra Dragons profile

Living people
Australian female rugby league players
Australia women's national rugby league team players
Rugby league players from Sydney
Sportswomen from New South Wales
Rugby league halfbacks
Sydney Roosters (NRLW) players
St. George Illawarra Dragons (NRLW) players
1994 births